United States gubernatorial elections were held in 1926, in 33 states, concurrent with the House and Senate elections, on November 2, 1926 (October 5 in Arkansas, and September 13 in Maine).

In South Carolina, the governor was elected to a four-year term for the first time, instead of a two-year term. In Maryland, the election was held in an even-numbered year for the first time, having previously been held in the odd numbered year preceding the United States presidential election year.

Results

See also 
1926 United States elections
1926 United States Senate elections
1926 United States House of Representatives elections

References

Notes 

 
November 1926 events